, also known as , was a Japanese Christian of the Edo period and leader of the Shimabara Rebellion, an uprising of Japanese Roman Catholics against the Shogunate. His Christian name was Geronimo and was later known as Francisco.

The uprising led by Shirō was defeated, and he was executed at the age of 17. His head was displayed on a pike near Nagasaki as a warning to Christians. His failures were reflected in the 1962 movie Amakusa Shirō Tokisada (shown in English-speaking countries as The Christian Revolt or The Revolutionary), by the Japanese movie director Nagisa Oshima.

Early life 
Shirō was born in 1621 as the son of Catholic parents, a former Konishi clan retainer, and his wife. Urban legend speculates that Shirō could have been the illegitimate son of Toyotomi Hideyori, but these claims have little credibility.

Portuguese Jesuit missionaries had been active in Japan since the late 16th century. By the age of 15, the charismatic youth was known to his Japanese Catholic followers as "Heaven's messenger". Miraculous powers were attributed to him.

Rebellion

Shirō was among Japanese Catholics who took over Hara Castle in a rebellion against the Shogunate. They mounted a coordinated defense that held off attackers, but the rebel force had no logistical support, and their resolve was weakened. Shirō was said to display posters in the castle to raise morale and said: "Now, those who accompany me in being besieged in this castle, will be my friends unto the next world."

One of the rebel soldiers, betrayed Shirō. He got a message to the Shogunate that rebel food supplies were running low. The Shogunate forces made a final assault, taking Hara Castle in the process. The Shogunate forces massacred almost 40,000 rebels. Yamada was the only recorded survivor.

Death
Shirō was taken captive and executed after the castle was overtaken. His head was displayed on a pike in Nagasaki for an extended period of time as a warning to potential Christian rebels.

See also

Makai Tensho

References 

 https://www.imdb.com/title/tt0055743/releaseinfo?ref_=tt_dt_dt#akas[unreliable source?]
 Michael Hoffman, "The Christian Century" Archived 31 August 2009 at the Wayback Machine, Japan Times, Dec. 2007

Bibliography 
 Jonathan Clements. Christ's Samurai: The True Story of the Shimabara Rebellion. London: Robinson (2016)
 Ivan Morris. The Nobility of Failure: Tragic Heroes in the History of Japan. London: Secker and Warburg (1975)

External links

 Amakusa Shirō Tokisada Web 
 Amakusa Shirō (Kumamoto Rekishi Jinbutsu) 

Amakusa Shiro
Amakusa Shiro
17th-century Japanese people
17th-century Roman Catholic martyrs
Catholicism in Japan
Japanese rebels
Japanese Roman Catholics
Amakusa Shiro
Samurai
People executed by Japan by decapitation
Executed Japanese people
17th-century executions by Japan